1091 Pictures is an American film studio based in New York City and Los Angeles. The company was founded as the film and television division subsidiary of The Orchard in 2015. The company is best known for the Oscar-nominated films Life, Animated and Cartel Land. Sony divested the company and its catalogue of over 4,000 in 2019, with the company adopting the name 1091 Media. In 2020, the company rebranded as 1091 Pictures and announced that its parent company rebranded as Streamwise, the name of its new technology platform in development.

History 
The company was founded in 2015, as a video on demand division of the Orchard, a subsidiary of Sony Entertainment. By year end, the company expanded to theatrical releases, initially setting a seven-film release with Mark Duplass, and Jay Duplass. The company also picked up Cartel Land, which went on to get an Academy Award nomination for Best Documentary in 2016.

In September 2016, the company announced a film transparency platform to help independent filmmakers get more data around rentals, streams and purchases as well as projections for when a film will break even and start generating profits.

In January 2019, the film and television studio was divested from The Orchard sold its film and television division. The company was acquired by the principals of Dimensional Associates, a private equity firm that launched The Orchard. The company's final films were Japanese Borscht and Baristas, before being rebranded as 1091 Media on April 3, 2019.

In April 2019, film studio Fathom Events signed a multi-year distribution deal with 1091 Media.

In July 2020, the company announced a new CTO, Simon Zhu, rebranded its distribution business as 1091 Pictures, and rebranded its parent company as Streamwise. Streamwise is a new technology platform the company is developing to provide distributors, production companies and filmmakers with insights and consolidated financial information for their releases, along with consolidated access to top streaming channels and other services. A private beta of the Streamwise platform is expected to release in December 2020, beginning with more than 500 distributors already tied to 1091 Pictures. The launch of Streamwise marks the final step in the separation of 1091's systems from its previous owner, The Orchard.

In August 2020, former Roku executive, Doug Shineman, joined 1091 Pictures and Streamwise as CRO, leading teams responsible for revenue generation, including all dealmaking, strategy and marketing for the business.

In March 2022, Chicken Soup for the Soul Entertainment acquired 1091 Pictures.

Filmography

As The Orchard

Under 1091 Pictures

References 

American companies established in 2015
Mass media companies established in 2015
American film studios
Television production companies of the United States
Film distributors of the United States
2015 establishments in California
Mass media companies based in New York City
2022 mergers and acquisitions